Robinson Bluff is a bold rock bluff overlooking the west side of lower Amundsen Glacier, just north of Whitney Glacier, in the Queen Maud Mountains. It was discovered in December 1929 by the Byrd Antarctic Expedition geological party under Laurence Gould, and was named by the Advisory Committee on Antarctic Names (US-ACAN) for Richard R. Robinson, a station engineer with the McMurdo Station winter party, 1966.

Cliffs of the Ross Dependency
Amundsen Coast